Mohammad Hossein Barkhah (born 24 January 1977 in Tehran) is a retired Iranian weightlifting champion. In 2003, while in Vancouver, Canada, at a competition, he twisted one of his arms while performing a snatch. He represented the Islamic Republic of Iran in weightlifting in both the 2000 and 2004 Olympics.

Major results

References 
 Iran Weightlifting Federation

External links
 
 
 
 

1977 births
Living people
Iranian male weightlifters
Iranian strength athletes
World Weightlifting Championships medalists
Olympic weightlifters of Iran
Weightlifters at the 2000 Summer Olympics
Weightlifters at the 2004 Summer Olympics
Iranian sportspeople in doping cases
Asian Games silver medalists for Iran
Asian Games medalists in weightlifting
Weightlifters at the 1998 Asian Games
Weightlifters at the 2002 Asian Games
Medalists at the 1998 Asian Games
Medalists at the 2002 Asian Games